The Financial Sector Conduct Authority (FSCA) is a financial institutions market conduct regulator and a successor agency to the Financial Services Board (South Africa) in South Africa.

References

Financial regulation in South Africa
2018 establishments in South Africa
Organisations based in Pretoria